Ludwig Heimrath Jr. (born September 9, 1956) is a Canadian businessman and former race car driver in open-wheel and sports-car racing.

Born in Scarborough, Ontario, Heimrath started his driving career racing Go-karts and Formula Fords. In 1979 and 1980 he won the Ontario Formula Ford Championship winning seven races in total. In 1981 and 1982, he competed in selected International Motorsport Association (IMSA) races. In 1983, he competed in the Robert Bosch Super Vee Series. Ludwig was named Rookie of the Year winning a race and two pole positions. He also drove a prototype in the 24 Hours of Le Mans that year. In 1984, he won three races and three pole positions racing Super Vees. The next several years, Ludwig competed in the IMSA GTP Series and drove a factory supported Porsche in Trans-Am. Starting in 1987 through 1989, Ludwig competed in selected CART races. In 1987, at the Indianapolis 500, he was the fastest qualifier the second weekend, qualifying tenth. His highest finish at the Indy 500 was 13th. 

Heimrath graduated as an engineer from Ryerson Polytechnical Institute (now Toronto Metropolitan University). He currently owns and operates All-Composite, Inc., a composite manufacturing company in the Pacific Northwest. He also is a college composite technology instructor and consultant.

Ludwig is married to Kathy Rude, the first woman to win a major international sports car race, a GTU class win at 24 Hours of Daytona in 1982 with Lee Mueller and Allan Moffat. Heimrath's father, Ludwig Heimrath Sr., won the Trans Am Series championship in 1977, becoming the first person born outside the United States to win the championship since Horst Kwech in 1966.

American open-wheel racing results

(key)

PPG Indycar Series

(key) (Races in bold indicate pole position)

Indianapolis 500

See also

List of Canadians in Champ Car

External links
Driver Database Profile

1956 births
Living people
SCCA Formula Super Vee drivers
Champ Car drivers
Indianapolis 500 drivers
Racing drivers from Ontario
Sportspeople from Scarborough, Toronto
Trans-Am Series drivers
World Sportscar Championship drivers
24 Hours of Le Mans drivers